Terry Clinton Baxter (born September 26, 1957) is an American politician in the state of Iowa. He was elected to the Iowa House of Representatives in 2014. He is also the Cofounder of GoServGlobal.

References

Republican Party members of the Iowa House of Representatives
1957 births
Living people
21st-century American politicians